Black is an unincorporated community in Edwards County, Illinois, United States.

References

Unincorporated communities in Edwards County, Illinois
Unincorporated communities in Illinois